Dermot Dunne (born 5 September 1943) is an Irish wrestler. He competed in the men's freestyle bantamweight at the 1960 Summer Olympics.

References

External links
 

1943 births
Living people
Irish male sport wrestlers
Olympic wrestlers of Ireland
Wrestlers at the 1960 Summer Olympics
Sportspeople from Dublin (city)
20th-century Irish people